A special election was held in  on October 3, 1803 to fill a vacancy caused by the resignation, before the start of the 8th Congress, of John Milledge (DR), who had been elected Governor of Georgia.

Election results

Bryan took his seat with the rest of the 8th Congress at the start of the 1st session.

See also
List of special elections to the United States House of Representatives

References

Georgia 1803 At-large
Georgia 1803 At-large
1803 At-large
Georgia At-large
1803 Georgia (U.S. state) elections
United States House of Representatives 1803 at-large